Mirko Kolnik (born 9 July 1936) is a Slovenian athlete. He competed in the men's decathlon at the 1960 Summer Olympics, representing Yugoslavia.

References

1936 births
Living people
Athletes (track and field) at the 1960 Summer Olympics
Slovenian decathletes
Yugoslav decathletes
Olympic athletes of Yugoslavia
Sportspeople from Ljubljana